California Lutheran High School (CLHS) California Lutheran is a private, college-preparatory, Christian high school in Wildomar, California, United States. Students come from the Temecula metro area, Lake Elsinore, and Riverside County. International students enroll from China, South Korea, Ethiopia, Nigeria, Japan, Brazil, and Hong Kong, among others.

California Lutheran is an Area Lutheran High School operated by the Wisconsin Evangelical Lutheran Synod (WELS). The school is accredited by the Accrediting Commission for Schools of the Western Association of Schools and Colleges.

Athletics
California Lutheran High School offers a variety of sports for both men and women. C-Hawk athletics are a part of the California Interscholastic Federation. CLHS is a member of the Arrowhead League. The athletic department offers the following sports: football, girls volleyball, boys and girls cross country, boys and girls basketball, boys and girls soccer, softball, baseball, golf and boys and girls track and field.

Doe v. California Lutheran High School Association
Prior to May 2009, the school accused two 16-year-old girls of possessing a "bond of intimacy" "characteristic of a lesbian relationship" and expelled them both. In 2009, the California Supreme Court ruled that it did not have to comply with the Unruh Civil Rights Act, a California state law preventing businesses from discriminating, because the school was a social organization and not a business. This was based on a 1998 state Supreme Court decision that defined the Boy Scouts as a social organization.

References

External links
 California Lutheran High School

Lutheranism in California
Private high schools in California
Wildomar, California
High schools in Riverside County, California
Secondary schools affiliated with the Wisconsin Evangelical Lutheran Synod
1977 establishments in California